The following is a list of episodes for the Australian television programme, Water Rats on Nine Network.

Series overview

Episodes

Season One

Season Two

Season Three

Season Four

Season Five

Season Six

See also
 Water Rats
 List of Water Rats characters

References

Lists of Australian drama television series episodes